Juan Herrera (born 12 January 1958) is a Mexican former professional boxer who competed from 1976 to 1988. He held the WBA flyweight title from 1981 to 1982.

Professional career
In September 1979, Herrera won the Yucatán State flyweight title by stopping veteran Marco Antonio Benitez in the tenth round.

WBA flyweight title
On September 26, 1981, Herrera won the WBA flyweight title by upsetting Panamanian Luis Ibarra via an eleventh round T.K.O. in Mérida, Yucatán, Mexico.

He lost the title to Santos Laciar, who beat him twice, the first time by thirteenth round knockout in Merida and the second time by fifteen round decision at Italy.

See also
List of Mexican boxing world champions
List of WBA world champions
List of flyweight boxing champions

References

External links

Sportspeople from Mérida, Yucatán
Boxers from Yucatán (state)
World boxing champions
World Boxing Association champions
World flyweight boxing champions
Flyweight boxers
1958 births
Living people
Mexican male boxers